Kadhale Jayam is a 2004 Indian Tamil-language romantic drama film directed by V. Natarajan starring himself, Sudeep, Swathika and Preethi Varma.

Cast 

V. Natarajan as Nataraj
Sudeep as Arvind
Swathika as Chitra 
Preethi Varma
Vadivelu as Pachaikaalai
Sneha Nambiar
Vadivukkarasi as Nataraj's mother
Vennira Aadai Moorthy
O. A. K. Sundar
Vasu Vikram
Bonda Mani
Anu Mohan
Vengal Rao
Halwa Vasu
Singamuthu
Gowthami Vembunathan
Madhan Bob
Vijay Ganesh
Kadhal Sukumar
Chelladurai

Production 
V. Natarajan, a Pondicherry businessman, directed, acted and produced the film under his banner Natarajan Films with Sudeep, Swatika and Preethi Varma in other roles. Swathi (changed her name to Swathika for the film), was supposed to play the heroine according to director Natarajan but was given an irrelevant character while Preeti Varma was cast as the heroine. She was mad at the makers of the film for not including her in the film's promotions.

Soundtrack 
The music is composed by Soundaryan. Lyrics by V. Natarajan.
"En Manathu Oram"
"Sight Adicha"
"Jigu Jigu"

Reception 
Malini Mannath of Chennai Online wrote that "But the film has turned out to be not so bad, with a fairly tolerable script and treatment, and with Natarajan playing his role with sincerity. [...] Swatika, neglected by the industry, performs fairly competently her role as Chitra who holds a torch for boss Nataraj. Vadivelu's comedy is enjoyable and is much better than in many of his earlier films".

The film is occasionally shown on Raj TV. After this film, Natarajan was to make a film with a leading Tamil actor, but no film ever materialised. Natajaran later produced and starred in the low-key film Gaja (2009) under the stage name of V. N. R.

References 

2004 films
2000s Tamil-language films
Indian romantic comedy films
2004 romantic comedy films